The 2002 McNeese State Cowboys football team represented McNeese State University as a member of the Southland Football League during the 2002 NCAA Division I-AA football season. Led by third-year head coach Tommy Tate, the Cowboys compiled an overall record of 13–2 with a mark of 6–0 in conference play, winning the Southland title. McNeese State advanced to the NCAA Division I-AA Football Championship playoffs, beating Montana State in the first round, Montana in the quarterfinals, and Villanova in the semifinals, before losing to Western Kentucky in the NCAA Division I-AA Championship Game. The team played home games at Cowboy Stadium in Lake Charles, Louisiana.

Schedule

References

McNeese State
McNeese Cowboys football seasons
Southland Conference football champion seasons
McNeese State Cowyboys football